Ashkirk is a small village on the Ale Water, in the Scottish Borders area of  Scotland. It is located just off the A7 road, approximately  each way between Selkirk to the north and Hawick to the south.

Other places nearby include the Alemoor Loch, Appletreehall, Belses, Essenside Loch, the Ettrick Water, Ettrickbridge, Philiphaugh, Salenside and Woll.

The village is home to the Woll golf course, Ashkirk Village Hall, and the Smiddy Bar & Restaurant

History

Formerly, two thirds of the  parish of Ashkirk lay in Roxburghshire and one third in Selkirkshire, including an enclave of Selkirkshire just east of the village around Synton. In 1891 a Boundary Commission moved the whole parish into Selkirkshire and added to Ashkirk a detached portion of the parish of Selkirk just west of the village, which was already in Selkirkshire (Todrig).

Notable persons

 Alasdair Allan, MSP for Na h-Eileanan an Iar (the Western Isles), grew up in Ashkirk.
 Doug Davies, Scottish rugby player, was born in Ashkirk.
 Scottish-Australian poet and bush balladeer Will H. Ogilvie (1869–1963) was born near Kelso, Scottish Borders, and from 1918 to his death he first leased then bought the Presbyterian church manse 'Kirklea' on the northside of Ashkirk.  After returning from Australia (1889–1901), Ogilvie became known as the Border poet, including penning Galloping shoes, Over the grass, Handful of leather, and The road to Roberton.  His wife Madge is buried with her parents in nearby Ettrickbridge.

Gallery

See also

 List of places in the Scottish Borders
 List of places in Scotland

References

External links

 Scotland's Places
 Standing Stones and Circles
 Vision of Britain
 Ashkirk Website

Villages in the Scottish Borders
Parishes in Roxburghshire
Parishes in Selkirkshire